Steven John Kilbey (born 13 September 1954) is an English-Australian singer-songwriter and bass guitarist for the rock band the Church. He is also a music producer, poet, and painter. As of 2020, Kilbey has released 14 solo albums and has collaborated on recordings with musical artists such as Martin Kennedy, Stephen Cummings and Ricky Maymi as a vocalist, musician, writer and/or producer. Ian McFarlane writes that "Kilbey's solo recordings [are] challenging and evocative. They ran the gamut of sounds and emotions from electronic and avant-garde to acoustic and symphonic, joyous and dreamy to saturnine and sardonic".

As of 2020, Kilbey has over 1000 original songs registered with Australian copyright agency Australasian Performing Right Association (APRA).

Career

1954-1979: Early years
Kilbey was born in Welwyn Garden City, England, UK, and moved to Australia with his parents at the age of five. He grew up around Dapto but the family eventually moved to Canberra. He began his professional music career at the age of 17 when he joined a Canberran five piece "cabaret band" called Saga. Around 1974 he joined a rock band featuring future Church bandmate Peter Koppes on drums called Precious Little.

This was followed by Kilbey forming Baby Grande around 1974 whilst still living in the Australian Capital Territory Koppes was also in Baby Grande for a time but left to travel, then played in a band called Limazine which brought him in touch with future Church drummer Nick Ward. Baby Grande recorded some demos for EMI Australia in 1977 but were not signed to a permanent recording contract. Baby Grande's demos surfaced on the internet after about 30 years, and despite initial protests from Kilbey, he has now made four of the five tracks available on his solo compilation album of early work Addendaone (2012).

Kilbey was also a member of the new wave band Tactics for approximately a month in 1977. He played "about four gigs" with Tactics before being asked to leave by the band's singer and songwriter Dave Studdert.

1980-present: The Church

Kilbey formed the Church, together with Koppes and Nick Ward in Sydney in the late 1970s. Marty Willson Piper joined the band in May 1980 days after his arrival in Australia when he went to see the band play a gig. After some success in their native Australia in the early 1980s, Kilbey and The Church went on to international fame when "Under the Milky Way", from the 1988 album Starfish, achieved success (Kilbey had co-written the song with Karin Jansson of Pink Champagne and Curious Yellow). "Under the Milky Way" appeared in the top-selling singles charts of both Australia and the United States (US). In late 2011 Kilbey revealed that, at the time of the interview, the song was still used for television programmes and advertisements. The Church were inducted into the ARIA Hall of Fame in 2012. At the ceremony, Kilbey delivered a lengthy speech as part of the induction that included stories from his musical career and a sung verse from the song "Old Man Emu" by Australian country music artist John Williamson.

In late 2012, as an act of protest against the conduct of the Church's North American label Second Motion Records, Kilbey announced his resignation from the band. The announcement was made on Kilbey's Facebook fan page following the receipt of an insufficient royalty cheque from the record label. However, the Church continued as an active band and, in November 2013, Kilbey published an official announcement on his Facebook fan page stating that Willson-Piper was replaced by former Powderfinger member Ian Haug. Kilbey explained that Haug would join the band for the recording of a new album, for which he had 16 songs written, as well as subsequent touring, and also defended the decision in the statement saying, "If you can't dig it I'm sorry. This is my f—ing band after all and it has existed at times without Peter and in the beginning without Marty and for times in between while he went AWOL."

Prior to the release of the Church's 21st album, Further/Deeper, Kilbey spoke to the media about his prolific body of musical work that is continually growing saying "Just because I've written that many songs [750] doesn't mean anything. But imagine if you were having an operation on your brain and a 60-year-old surgeon walked into the theatre. You would think, I'm in safe hands. He's been doing this all his life and he's very good at it. I think I have become very good at pulling lyrics and melodies out of the air. Melodies weren't always my strong point; on a lot of The Church's early records the melodies weren't as elaborate as what I'm doing now. In the last few years, I think I am tapping into something ... It's like I'm tapping into the collective human subconscious."

Solo work

1985-1991: Red Eye label
Kilbey released his debut solo single, "This Asphalt Eden" in July 1985.

Kilbey's first studio albums Unearthed, Earthed the mini-album The Slow Crack were released in 1986 and 1987. Issued simultaneously with Earthed was a book of the same name containing Kilbey's prose and poetry (published in 1986). The Earthed album was conceived as a possible soundtrack to the reading of the book, which had come first in terms of conception.

Following the worldwide success of The Church's Starfish album and "Under the Milky Way" single, Kilbey returned to his solo career in 1989 with his third album, Remindlessness in December 1989. In December 1991, Kilbey released the EP Narcosis, his last solo release for the Red Eye label.

1992-present: Continued success
In 1992, Kilbey and his younger brother, John Kilbey launched the Australian record label Karmic Hit. The label roster included the owners' bands, side projects and solo works as well as those by other artists: the Bhagavad Guitars (John Kilbey's group), Snog, David Lane and Halogen.

In 1997, Kilbey collaborated with brother Russell on the ambient instrumental/electronic album Gilt Trip. (1997) In May 1997, Kilbey released Narcosis Plus.

Between 2009 and 2017, Kilbey released numerous collaborative albums with Martin Kennedy of All India Radio as Kilbey/Kennedy. Kennedy explained the inception of the working relationship in a 2013 interview: "I was working with Steve long before I actually met him. Steve had heard All India Radio, and he asked my brother John if I had any spare instrumental songs lying around that he could contribute lyrics to." Kennedy subsequently sent Kilbey "thrown-away tracks" from All India Radio recording sessions.

In July 2013, Kilbey performed at the Fly By Night venue in the Western Australian port city of Fremantle, with local musicians, Shaun and Adrian Hoffmann (The Hoffmenn), Shaun Corlson, Rachael Aquillina and Anna Sarcich playing as his backing band. Aquillina and Sarcich formed the string section, leading to the naming of the corresponding live recording: With Strings Attached. According to Kilbey's Time Being site, he explored his "back catalogue of solo releases, collaborations and Church classics" during the performance.

Other projects
Kilbey founded Hex and Jack Frost.

1988-1991: Hex
In 1988, Kilbey formed the duo Hex with singer, songwriter and guitarist Donnette Thayer. Hex released two albums, the self-titled Hex in 1989 and Vast Halos 1990.

1990-1996: Jack Frost
In 1990, Kilbey formed Jack Frost as a collaboration with Grant McLennan of Brisbane band The Go-Betweens. Jack Frost released a debut self-titled album in December 1991, preceded by the single "Every Hour God Sends". The duo released a second studio album, Snow Job in 1996, prior to McLennan's death.

1994-1995: Fake
In 1995, Kilbey formed Fake with Boris Goudenov and Sandy Chick. Fake released a self-titled album on Mushroom records in 1994.

2004-2012: Isidore
In 2004, Kilbey formed Isidore with John Kilbey and Jeffrey Cain of Remy Zero. Isidore released a self-titled album in 2004 and a second album Life Somewhere Else in 2012.

2007: Mimesis
In 2007, Kilbey formed the ambient, psychedelic crossover band, Mimesis, with Simon Polinski, Colin Berwick and David Abiuso. They released an album, Art Imitating Life in 2007 on the Psy-Harmonics label.

2013: Speed of the Stars
Speed of the Stars are Steve Kilbey and Frank Kearns. They released a self-titled album in June 2016.

Writing
Kilbey released Earthed in 1986. In 1998, Kilbey published a book of poetry entitled Nineveh/The Ephemeron; Kilbey later republished a hard copy version that contained both books and a limited number of 50 copies was released.

In August 2013, Uncollected, described as, "A deluxe edition of his books - Earthed, The Ephemeron, Nineveh, Fruit Machine and other selected work", was released on his own Time Being label. Kilbey's inaugural autobiography, Something Quite Peculiar, was then published by Hardie Grant on 1 November 2014.

Bibliography
 Earthed (1986) - Steve Kilbey
 Nineveh & The Ephemeron (1998) – Steve Kilbey/Erskine Music and Word. Published by Trevor Boyd. 
 Earthed, Nineveh, and The Ephemeron, 2004, Impressed Publishing, . Published by Graham Nunn. 
 Fruit Machine (2007) – Steve Kilbey (assisted by Graham Nunn).
 Uncollected (2013) - Steve Kilbey/Edited by Steve Kilbey, Graham Nunn and Samantha Mayfair. Published by The Time Being.
 Kate Morgan (ed) Songs from the Road: Touring Tales from Our Best Singer-Songwriters. Sydney: Pier 9/Murdoch Books, 2013.
 Something Quite Peculiar (2014) - Steve Kilbey. Published by Hardie Grant Books

Art 
In addition to his other creative outlets, Kilbey is an artist who has had at least two exhibits in the United States. A collection of his paintings have been released as a tarot deck called The Tarot of the Time Being

Personal life
Kilbey resides in Australia, he has also lived in Stockholm, Sweden and Los Angeles. Kilbey has twin daughters (Elektra and Miranda) with Karin Jansson, his ex-girlfriend. Elektra and Miranda have a popular dream pop duo called Say Lou Lou and record in their homeland of Sweden.

He also has a second set of twins, Eve and Aurora as well as another daughter, Scarlet with his American-born partner, Natalie.

Kilbey has stated multiple times that he believes he has Asperger syndrome.

Drug use
As documented in the authorised biography No Certainty Attached (written with Kilbey's involvement), Kilbey was dependent on the drug heroin during the 1990s, an aspect of the musician's personal life that was mostly hidden until Kilbey was arrested on a drug-related charge in 1999 in New York City. Kilbey eventually ceased using the drug after a period of detoxification in 2000. In a 2012 interview, Kilbey reflected on his personal history: "I also have a lot of regret that I didn't do it better, that I wasn't a better person, that I wasn't nicer to people or make better records and that at times I would slack off and just do any old thing. I wish I hadn't made so many mistakes with the drugs."

Kilbey stated that he wrote most songs of his while under the influence of marijuana, as it helps him cope with his Asperger syndrome or autism. "Pot allows my mind to do the things it wants to do, which is freely associate," he said.

Kilbey then participated in an interview for journalist and writer Andrew McMillen's 2014 book Talking Smack: Honest Conversations About Drugs, as well as a July 2014 feature interview with McMillen for the Australian newspaper. Kilbey explained in an article that he was introduced to the drug by now-deceased Australian musician Grant McLennan, of Brisbane band The Go-Betweens, during the recording period for a new project named Jack Frost. "It came right out of the blue... It [heroin] was the last thing on my mind. I went, 'Oh, here's $100, get me some too.' No one had ever offered it to me up until then. All the other drugs you might get offered but no one ever says, 'Hey, want some heroin?' It's not like that. If you've got a stash, you don't offer it. You don't really go around turning other people on. It's not the sort of thing you advertise."

Kilbey states that he "loved" heroin when he first snorted it and continued to use the drug while living in a Surry Hills, Sydney home that doubled as a recording studio. Kilbey then made the transition to injecting the drug with the assistance of a fellow heroin user who was an unregistered doctor. He explained to McMillen that he also became fascinated with the culture surrounding the use of the drug. Upon reflection, Kilbey described it as a "rubbish world."

Following unsuccessful interventions involving family and friends and a relocation to Sweden where he found heroin easier to obtain, Kilbey eventually used methadone in 2002 to wean himself off opiates. Since 2002, Kilbey has occasionally used heroin but as he explained in the Australian interview, "it [heroin] doesn't do it for me. I have no temptation. I'm just not interested anymore." The interview concludes with Kilbey expressing his belief about the problematic nature of drug prohibition, whereby the musician referred to opiate use during the 19th century. "We let people have booze, cigarettes, wars ... Why not let them have smack? People used to take it and it wasn't seen as a problem. If you lived in 1890 and you were an opium fiend, that was your problem: to take it and to find out how to stop taking it. It was nothing to do with the law ... Now, I'm not going to sit here and go, 'Oh, kids, look what I did to my life because I was a drug addict. Please don't be like me. Please be Mister Straight.' I don't believe in that either. I think we have to grow up and look at why drugs are illegal ... I just don't want people to believe the hype, that if you take drugs, you're necessarily an evil villain. You might be a silly person or a weak person. But you're not a bad person."

Spirituality
Kilbey has revealed that he and Richard Ploog often visited Sydney's Adyar Bookshop (bookshop of the Theosophical Society) during the 1980s to read books by occultist and mystical authors such as Helena Blavatsky, George Gurdjieff and P.D. Ouspensky. Likewise, spiritual mysticism is evident in the lyrics of songs as early as "An Interlude" with its line "psychic angels spread on the top of her head", and the song "Tear It All Away" whose lyrics are clearly about seeing beyond the mundane . The song "When You Were Mine" on The Blurred Crusade is about past-life experience ("On a day like this, a hundred lifetimes ago..."). "Myrrh" from Heyday includes Christian imagery but seems to be as much about the nature of inner mystical experience: "How can you be so invisible?/Give me the eyes to see/Privilege on privilege/An unwanted discovery" The thread of spiritual exploration runs through many of Kilbey's lyrics to the present day, such as on more recent songs such as "Invisible" from 2002 (first appeared on After Everything Now This), with its refrain: "All I ever wanted to see was just invisible to me."

Kilbey's lyrics often quote historical and mythological events and his interest in Eastern culture and religion frequently informs his music—this also applies to his painting (he often paints Hindu gods and goddesses). He has cited the Bhagavad Gita as a particular influence, describing himself as a devotee of Krishna.

Discography

Studio albums

Soundtracks

Live albums

Compilations

Box Sets

Extended plays

Singles

Awards and nominations

Australian Songwriter's Hall of Fame
The Australian Songwriters Hall of Fame was established in 2004 to honour the lifetime achievements of some of Australia's greatest songwriters.

|-
| 2011.
| himself
| Australian Songwriter's Hall of Fame
| 
|}

References

External links

Official website
Kilbey's biography on The Church's official website

, 1986
Official website for Isidore

1954 births
Living people
Australian baritones
Australian bloggers
Australian rock bass guitarists
The Church (band) members
English baritones
English bloggers
English new wave musicians
English rock bass guitarists
Male bass guitarists
English record producers
Australian record producers
People from Welwyn Garden City
People from Canberra
English male singer-songwriters
Australian new wave musicians
Australian male singer-songwriters
English male poets
Australian male poets
20th-century English painters
English male painters
21st-century English painters
Australian painters
English emigrants to Australia
Musicians from Hertfordshire
British male bloggers
Australian male guitarists
Second Motion Records artists